Monium is an album by American jazz flautist Jeremy Steig released on the Columbia label in 1974.

Track listing
All compositions by Eddie Gómez and Jeremy Steig except where noted
 "Mason Land Express" − 8:03
 "Bluesdom" − 7:46
 "Djinn Djinn" (Gómez, Steig, Marty Morrell) − 9:30
 "Space Maiden" − 3:12
 "Monium" (Gómez) − 7:50
 "Dream Passage" − 11:14

Personnel
Jeremy Steig – flute, bass flute
Eddie Gómez − bass
Marty Morell – drums, percussion
Ray Mantilla − congas, timbales
Technical
Frank Laico - engineer
John Hammond - recording supervisor
Ed Lee - art direction
Jeremy Steig - cover drawings
Don Hunstein - photography

References

Columbia Records albums
Jeremy Steig albums
1974 albums